Myrmeleon pictifrons is a species of antlion. It is native to the Australasian region and is one of over 2000 species of antlion that have been recorded globally.

References

Myrmeleontinae
Insects of Australia
Taxa named by Carl Eduard Adolph Gerstaecker
Insects described in 1885